Adriaen van der Goes (Delft, around 1505 - Delft, November 5, 1560) was a Dutch Grand pensionary. He was the son of Grand pensionary of Holland Aert van der Goes, and he succeeded his father in this position.

Biography

Presumably Van der Goes studied at the University of Leuven. In 1540 he joined his father Aert van der Goes to support him as Grand pensionary. On the recommendation of René of Chalon, he was appointed State Attorney (Grand Pensionary) of the States of Holland on January 30, 1544. He remained Grand pensionary until his death in 1560. Van der Goes continued the Register van de Dachvaerden der Statens's Lands van Holland, started by his father. This register appeared in print in 1750.

Family
Adriaen van der Goes was the son of Grand Pensionary Aert van der Goes and Margaretha van Banchem. He married Anna Laurensdr. van Spangen (died 1548), presumably a daughter of Laurens Pietersz van Spangen. They had nine children together, three of whom died young. Their sons Christiaan, Aert, Andries and Philip all held high offices. The husband of their daughter Maria, Pieter van der Meer (1534-1616), was also a high official.

References

Sources
 H. P. Fölting: De landsadvocaten en raadpensionarissen der Staten van Holland en West-Friesland 1480–1795. Een genealogische benadering. In: Jaarboek Centraal Bureau voor Genealogie, 27 (1972), S. 294–343.

 
 

Year of birth uncertain
1525 deaths
16th-century Dutch lawyers
Grand Pensionaries
Old University of Leuven alumni